My Father Evgeni   is a 2010 American documentary film written, directed and produced by Andrei Zagdansky. The film tells the story of Evgeni Zagdansky, a World War II veteran, who became a filmmaker and head of the state film studio Kyivnaukfilm in Kyiv, Ukraine.

Film festivals and awards
International Documentary Festival in Amsterdam (2010); Kyiv International Film Festival, (2010), Artdocfest, Moscow (2010); Docudays (2011), Documenta Madrid (2011);  Krakowski Festival Filmowy, Kraków, Poland (2011); Istanbul International Film Festival 1001 Documentary, 2011; 2nd DOC NYC New York Documentary Film Festival, (2011); New York Jewish Film Festival, Lincoln Center, (2012). 
"My Father Evgeni" was awarded "Laurel Branch" for the Best Feature Documentary, Moscow, 2010.

Press
"My Father Evgeni," a smart, impressionistic documentary about the passage of historical time as experienced by father and son. Using a cleverly thought out combination of archival footage, family movies and films from his father's studio, bracketed by haunting footage of the now deserted corridors of that film factory, Andrei traces his family's and his nation's complicated, fractured history. Working with the play of textures that he gets by juxtaposing and manipulating the various film stocks, the director creates a dialectic of time — his father always speaking and thinking about the future, the son always dredging up the past — and the hurt of exile, that is both moving and smart."

George Robinson "The Jewish Week"

"My Father Evgeni"... a simple tale of a father and son made up of few elements: archival footage tracing the rise and fall of the Soviet state; lushly photographed images of New York, present-day Kyiv and an abandoned film studio; family video; some letters from father to son read aloud that push the narrative along. These pieces are woven into a pleasurably drifting biographical tale that spans decades in the lives of Evgeni and Andrei. It's supremely personal but thankfully never maudlin. I especially appreciated how Zagdansky presents each new piece of newsreel, and in voiceover offers commentary: "Here, I was X years old." The filmmaker is not in the frame, these aren't home movies, at least not exactly. His choice of syntax highlights the complicated familial relationship to images (both the deceased father and son were filmmakers) and history (and images and history to each other) that runs throughout the film. Its low-key aesthetics are decidedly unfashionable, but I enjoyed its reverie-inducing spell all the more for it"

Jeff Reichert "Sundance Now"

External links

My Father Evgeni on AZ Films website
"DOC NYC: Dispatch #1" by Jeff Reichert, blog "Sundance Now"
"Movies Around The Clock" by George Robinson, "The Jewish Week"

2010 films
American documentary films
2010s Russian-language films
Documentary films about film directors and producers
Films directed by Andrei Zagdansky
2010s English-language films
2010s American films